IIAP may refer to:

 Type 85-IIAP - a battle tank
 Indian Institute of Astrophysics (IIA or IIAP)
 Institut international d’administration publique - a French service public academy
 Institute for Informatics and Automation Problems - a development institute of the National Academy of Sciences of Armenia

See also

 llap (disambiguation)
 IAP (disambiguation)
 AP2 (disambiguation)